Kasper Poulsen is a Danish wheelchair curler and curling coach.

Teams

Record as a coach of national teams

References

External links 

Living people
Danish male curlers
Danish wheelchair curlers
Danish curling coaches
Year of birth missing (living people)